The 1913–14 Georgia Bulldogs basketball team represents the University of Georgia during the 1913–14 college men's basketball season. The team captain of the 1913–14 season was T.C. Brand.

Schedule

|-

References

Georgia Bulldogs basketball seasons
Georgia
Bulldogs
Bulldogs